Bruce Humber (11 October 1913 – 17 August 1988) was a Canadian sprinter. He competed in the men's 100 metres at the 1936 Summer Olympics.

References

1913 births
1988 deaths
Athletes (track and field) at the 1936 Summer Olympics
Canadian male sprinters
Olympic track and field athletes of Canada
Athletes from Victoria, British Columbia